Insight Turkey is an academic journal publishing peer-reviewed articles on Turkish politics since 1999. The previous editor of the journal was Talip Küçükcan, a professor of sociology at the Marmara University İstanbul, Turkey, but who is now the AKP Member of Parliament for Adana.

Insight Turkey is indexed and abstracted in EBSCO, European Sources Online (ESO), Index Islamicus, Middle East & Central Asian Studies, Scopus, Sociological Abstracts. and Worldwide Political Science Abstracts, among other scientific databases. Back issues are open to public view and downloading free of charge.

Gallery

External links 
 

1999 establishments in Turkey
Political science journals
Publications established in 1999